Delia Bogard (June 26, 1921 - July 15, 1995) was an American film actress and dancer.

Biography
Bogard was born in San Francisco, California. She played the role of "Tomboy Taylor" in Fontaine Fox's Mickey McGuire film series from 1927 to 1933. After departing from the series, she became a dancer for stage and screen appearances.

In March 1939, Bogard was attacked and seriously injured while on the campus of Los Angeles City College.

In 1945, Bogard made a guest appearance as herself in the film Mickey the Great, a feature compilation of the Mickey McGuire short films, which paid tribute to the old Mickey McGuire series. She died in 1995 at age 74.

References

External links

Delia Bogard Biography

See also
Mickey McGuire
Mickey Rooney
Billy Barty
Jimmy Robinson

1921 births
1995 deaths
American film actresses
Actresses from San Francisco
20th-century American actresses